Making Good is a 1932 animated short film by Walter Lantz Productions, starring Oswald the Lucky Rabbit. It is the 57th Oswald film by Lantz's studio, and the 110th overall.

Plot
A stork flies and carries a sack full of humanoid creatures which have antennas on their heads. The stork then enters a world in the heavens called Fairy Land. Oswald somehow is standing by in that world.

Though not affiliated with the stork, Oswald decides to assist that fowl. The stork approaches the home of a swallow, and Oswald does the negotiation. The swallow, however, declines the offer. Oswald and the stork then come to a weasel but get a similar response. Next, the two come to a granny who lives in a giant boot. This time their offer is accepted.

Contrary to the size of the sack, the humanoid creatures inside come out in dozens. It mattered little to the granny, though. Yards away, a mischievous giant terrier spots the boot, and heads to its location.

The terrier catches the boot's lace, and tries to take it. The creatures, who are bothered by the disturbance, evacuate. When the terrier runs away with the lace, Oswald, using a whistle, calls a flock of blue jays to shoo away the canine. The terrier returns to chew on the boot. Oswald uses the whistle again, this time calling a swarm of fleas. The terrier is so bothered by the fleas, thus starting to bite and scratch a lot. This goes until all the terrier's hairs fall off.

Though naked, the terrier takes the boot, and tosses it off an edge of Fairy Land. The terrier thinks he has the last laugh, and goes on to howl loudly. A giant Fairy Land inhabitant finds the howling bothersome, and therefore hurls a jar. The terrier finds his head stuck in the jar, prompting that canine to leave the scene for good. Oswald goes to also do some howling, thus irritating more inhabitants who hurl boots at him. Oswald then collects the boots and offers them to the creatures as replacements for the discarded one.

References

External links
Making Good at the Big Cartoon Database

1932 films
1932 animated films
1930s American animated films
1930s animated short films
American black-and-white films
Films directed by Walter Lantz
Oswald the Lucky Rabbit cartoons
Universal Pictures animated short films
Walter Lantz Productions shorts
Animated films about animals
Animated films about birds